Timothy James Kelly (born 1969) is a United States district judge of the United States District Court for the District of Columbia and former chief counsel for national security and senior crime counsel to the Senate Judiciary Committee.

Biography 

Kelly received his Bachelor of Arts, cum laude, from Duke University, and his Juris Doctor from Georgetown Law, where he was a senior associate editor of the American Criminal Law Review. Kelly spent a decade as a federal prosecutor, serving first as an Assistant United States Attorney in the District of Columbia and then as a trial attorney in the Public Integrity Section of the Department of Justice's Criminal Division. Kelly also spent several years as a civil litigator at Arnold & Porter. He clerked for Judge Ronald L. Buckwalter on the United States District Court for the Eastern District of Pennsylvania. He also served as the Republican staff director for the Senate's Caucus on International Narcotics Control, and from 2013 to 2017 Judge Kelly served as Chief Counsel for National Security and Senior Crime Counsel to U.S. Senate Judiciary Committee Chairman Charles E. Grassley.

Federal judicial service 

On June 7, 2017, President Donald Trump nominated Kelly to serve as a United States District Judge of the United States District Court for the District of Columbia, to the seat vacated by Judge Rosemary M. Collyer, who assumed senior status on May 18, 2016. A hearing on his nomination before the Senate Judiciary Committee took place on June 28, 2017. On July 13, 2017, his nomination was reported out of committee by a voice vote. On September 5, 2017, the United States Senate confirmed his nomination by a 94–2 vote. He received his judicial commission on September 8, 2017.

Notable cases 

Kelly presided over English v. Trump, a lawsuit related to the Federal Vacancies Reform Act and the successor to the Director of the Consumer Financial Protection Bureau, Richard Cordray, who had resigned in November 2017 to kick off a run for Governor of Ohio. Before resigning, Cordray appointed Leandra English as his deputy. President Trump appointed Mick Mulvaney, the Director of the Office of Management and Budget, to serve as acting director. Kelly declined to issue a temporary restraining order and held that Mulvaney could remain as acting director.

Kelly presided over CNN v. Trump, a lawsuit about President Trump's decision to revoke Jim Acosta's White House press credentials, denying him access to the White House grounds. CNN filed a lawsuit in order to challenge this decision and alleged this violated Acosta's first and fifth amendment rights. On November 16, 2018, Kelly ruled that Acosta could return to the White House, pending a trial. On November 19, 2018, CNN dropped the suit.

On December 28, 2021, Kelly refused to dismiss an indictment against four members of the Proud Boys who were charged with conspiracy in the 2021 United States Capitol attack.

Memberships 

He has been a member of the Federalist Society since 2009.

Personal life 

Kelly lives in Washington, D.C., with his wife and two children.

References

External links 
 
 Biography at District Court for the District of Columbia
 

1969 births
Living people
20th-century American lawyers
21st-century American lawyers
21st-century American judges
Arnold & Porter people
Assistant United States Attorneys
Duke University alumni
Federalist Society members
Georgetown University Law Center alumni
Judges of the United States District Court for the District of Columbia
Lawyers from Washington, D.C.
People from Glen Cove, New York
United States district court judges appointed by Donald Trump
Washington, D.C., Republicans